Jean Banchet (March 7, 1941—November 24, 2013) was a French-American chef who popularized French cuisine through his Wheeling, Illinois restaurant, Le Francais.

References

1941 births
2013 deaths
American chefs
People from Wheeling, Illinois